Hwasan Lee clan (Vietnamese: Gia tộc Lý Hoa Sơn) is a Korean clan. Their Bon-gwan is in Kumchon County, North Hwanghae Province. , there are 1775 members of this clan. Their founder was Lee Yong-sang (Vietnamese: Lý Long Tường), a member of the Vietnamese royal family of the Lý dynasty. He was exiled to Goryeo through the Song dynasty in 1226 when the Lý dynasty fell to the Trần dynasty.

See also 
 Korean clan names of foreign origin
 Jeongseon Lee clan

References

External links 
 

 
Korean clan names of Vietnamese origin
Yi clans
South Korea–Vietnam relations